Jerry Williams (born 24 March 1960) is an English former professional footballer who played as a midfielder.

Career
Born in Didcot, Williams played in the Football League for Reading, Gillingham and Aldershot, before playing non-league football for Windsor & Eton.

References

1960 births
Living people
English footballers
Reading F.C. players
Gillingham F.C. players
Aldershot F.C. players
Windsor & Eton F.C. players
English Football League players
Association football midfielders